Acacia multispicata, commonly known as spiked wattle, is a shrub belonging to the genus Acacia and the subgenus Juliflorae that is endemic to south western Australia.

Description
It can have a dense and often rounded habit with glabrous or sparingly haired branchlets that have white to grey coloured new shoots occasionally with golden tips. Like most species of Acacia it has phyllodes rather than true leaves. The terete to compressed evergreen phyllodes are sometimes flat and linear and straight to slightly curved. It flowers from March to October producing yellow flowers. The simple inflorescences occur singly or in pairs found in the axils. Following flowering glabrous, green that age to brown, thinly crustaceous seed pods form. The pods have a linear shape and are well raised over and constricted between each of the seeds.

Taxonomy
It is part of the Acacia multispicata group which also includes the closely related Acacia sessilispica and Acacia singula.
The specific epithet is derived from the Latin words multi meaning many and spicata meaning spiked in reference to the large number of inflorescences that cover the shrub when it is in bloom.

Distribution
It is native to Mid West, Wheatbelt, Great Southern and Goldfields-Esperance regions of Western Australia where it is found growing in yellow sandy soils. The range of the shrub extends from around Northampton in the north down to around Cranbrook in the south. It extends eastwards as far as to just south west of Coolgardie and the Frank Hann National Park where it is usually situated on sand-plains as an apart of heathland or scrubland communities.

See also
 List of Acacia species

References

multispicata
Acacias of Western Australia
Plants described in 1864
Taxa named by George Bentham